Julieta Susana "Julie" Gonzalo (born September 9, 1981) is an Argentine-born American actress. On television, she has played Parker Lee on Veronica Mars (2006–2007; 2019), Maggie Dekker on Eli Stone (2008–2009), Pamela Rebecca Barnes on the soap opera Dallas (2012–2014) and Andrea Rojas on Supergirl (2019–2021). She has appeared in films such as Freaky Friday (2003), Dodgeball (2004), A Cinderella Story (2004) and Christmas with the Kranks (2004).

Early life
Julieta Susana Gonzalo was born in Ciudad de Buenos Aires, Buenos Aires, Argentina.

She grew up in General San Martín Partido but when she was 8 years old, her family emigrated to Miami Beach, Florida. She began her career as a model, and later became interested in acting, taking theater classes. Gonzalo moved to Los Angeles, and made her feature film debut in the 2002 romantic comedy I'm with Lucy opposite Monica Potter.

Career
On television, Gonzalo debuted in The WB comedy series Greetings from Tucson. In early 2003, she won the main role of The WB comedy pilot, called Exit 9, but the show was not picked up. The same year, she appeared on NCIS. In 2004, Gonzalo starred opposite Tori Spelling in another pilot Me, Me, Me for UPN, which was also not picked up. She also guest-starred in the pilot episode of Drake & Josh in 2004.

Gonzalo appeared in several films in her early career. In 2003, she had a role as Lindsay Lohan's character's rival in Freaky Friday. She played a similar role the following year in the romantic comedy A Cinderella Story, opposite Hilary Duff and Chad Michael Murray, and also appeared in DodgeBall: A True Underdog Story as Justin Long's love interest and Christmas with the Kranks, as Jamie Lee Curtis' character's daughter. In 2005, she had supporting role in another romantic comedy, Must Love Dogs. Her other credits including 2007 thriller Cherry Crush and the lead role in the 2013 comedy horror movie Vamp U.

In 2006, Gonzalo was cast in a series regular role as Parker Lee on The CW mystery television series Veronica Mars. After the cancellation of the series, she was cast as one of the leads in the ABC comedy pilot called The News. In next year, Gonzalo began starring as Maggie Dekker in ABC legal comedy-drama Eli Stone opposite Jonny Lee Miller. In 2008 she won ALMA Award for Outstanding Supporting Actress in a Drama Series for role in Eli Stone. The series was cancelled after two seasons in 2009.

Gonzalo had been cast as the lead in the NBC's unaired science fiction series Day One in 2009. While originally intended to air on NBC midseason in the 2009–2010 TV season with a 13-episode season, the project became a four-episode miniseries. By May 2010, it was concluded the show would likely never air. She later guest-starred in Castle, Nikita, The Glades and CSI: Miami.

In 2011, Gonzalo was cast as series regular in the TNT revival of Dallas, which premiered on June 13, 2012. Her character, Rebecca Sutter, was later revealed to be Pamela Rebecca Barnes, the daughter of the characters Cliff Barnes (Ken Kercheval) and Afton Cooper (Audrey Landers) from the original series. The series was cancelled after three seasons in 2014. The following years, she starred in a number of Hallmark Channel television movies, as well as guest starred in Grey's Anatomy and Lucifer.

For the 2019–20 season, Gonzalo was cast as Andrea Rojas in the fifth season of Supergirl, as a series regular.

Personal life

Gonzalo met Chris McNally in 2018 on the set of The Sweetest Heart, a Hallmark Channel movie, and the pair began dating, although they did not publicize their relationship.

On June 5, 2022, it was announced via Gonzalo's Instagram that she and McNally had welcomed their first child.

Filmography

Film

Television

References

External links

1981 births
Living people
Actresses from Buenos Aires
Actresses from Miami
Argentine emigrants to the United States
American film actresses
American soap opera actresses
American television actresses
Argentine film actresses
Argentine soap opera actresses
Argentine television actresses
Hispanic and Latino American actresses
21st-century American actresses
21st-century Argentine actresses